The Peace Development Fund is a non-profit public foundation, based in Amherst, Massachusetts. Its mission statement describes it as working "to build the capacity of community-based organizations through grants, training, and other resources as partners in the human rights and social justice movements.

The fund was co-founded in 1981 by Bob Mazer and Meg Gage, and originally focused on funding grassroots anti-nuclear organizations. They soon expanded to fund groups opposing the Reagan administration's policies in Central America, and later to low-income community organizing not necessarily related to war-and-peace issues. This last led to a broadened board of directors: as Meg Gage put it in 2007, "…to build a strong peace and social justice movement, you have to connect with people of color… I'm very proud of the large, diverse board we built."

History

Grants and Programs

Grant Applications and Reporting

What Peace Development Fund Funds

The Peace Development Fund makes grants to organizations and projects working to achieve peaceful, just and equitable relationships among people and nations. They believe that the change in values needed to establish a more just and peaceful world can come about only if it is strongly rooted in local communities that value the importance of building movements to create systemic social change. These are communities that view everyone, especially young people, as a vital force in the transformation of society. We recognize young people’s ability to reshape our society politically, spiritually and culturally. The Peace Development Fund is committed to supporting organizations and projects that recognize that peace will never be sustained unless it is based on justice and an appreciation of both the diversity and unity of the human family. They understand peace to be a consequence of equitable relationships—with our fellow human beings and with the natural environment of which we are a part and on which we depend. Recently Peace Development Fund have witnessed the negative effects of the United States as the world’s sole superpower, neo-liberalism and the globalization of capitalism, the limiting of civil liberties in the U.S. and abroad, decreases in funding for social services and the continued strengthening of the Right. Some of these consequences include the widening gap between rich and poor, heightening militarization and use of US military violence, increasing incidences of hate crimes and increasing poverty and unemployment. This is evidence that some of the institutional and structural causes of injustice, whether physical, social, or economic, remain largely intact. Challenging those causes and developing community-based alternatives that promote a more just, nonviolent society is at the heart of Peace Development Fund's grant-making program.

Notes

Foundations based in the United States
Anti–nuclear weapons movement
Community organizing
Organizations established in 1981